This list compares the features and functionality of application servers, grouped by the hosting environment that is offered by that particular application server.

BASIC 
 Run BASIC  An all-in-one BASIC scriptable application server, can automatically manage session and state.

C 
 Enduro/X  A middleware platform for distributed transaction processing, based on XATMI and XA standards, open source, C API

C++ 
 Tuxedo  Based on the ATMI standard, is one of the original application servers.
 Wt  A web toolkit similar to Qt permitting GUI-application-like web development with built-in Ajax abilities.
 POCO C++ Libraries  A set of open source class libraries including Poco.Net.HTTPServer.html
 CppCMS
 Enduro/X  A middleware platform for distributed transaction processing, based on XATMI and XA standards, open source

Go 
 Enduro/X ASG  Application server for Go. This provides XATMI and XA facilities for Golang. Go application can be built by normal Go executable files which in turn provides stateless services, which can be load balanced, clustered and reloaded on the fly without service interruption by means of administrative work only. Framework provides distributed transaction processing facility for Go.

Java 

 Apache MINA  an abstract event-driven asynchronous API over various transports such as TCP/IP and UDP/IP via Java NIO
 Netty  a non-blocking I/O client-server framework for the development of Java network applications similar in spirit to Node.js

JavaScript 
 Broadvision  Server-side JavaScript AS. One of the early entrants in the market during the eCommerce dot-com bubble, they have vertical solution packages catering to the eCommerce industry.
 Wakanda Server  Server-side JavaScript application server integrating a NoSQL database engine (WakandaDB), a dedicated HTTP server, user, and group management and an optional client-side JavaScript framework.
 Node.js  implements Google's V8 engine as a standalone (outside the browser) asynchronous Javascript interpreter. A vigorous open-source developer community on GitHub has implemented many supporting products, notably npm for package management and Connect and Express app server layers.
 Deno  community developed Rust project, spearheaded by Ryan Dahl who also created Node.js, it directly targets TypeScript but also supports JavaScript and WebAssembly via V8; employs asynchronous, event-based I/O model via promise-based APIs and Tokio scheduler, uses an API security model via FlatBuffers and implements package management via ES2015 modules.
 Phusion Passenger
 Jsish a JavaScript engine with type-checking modelled after Tcl.

LPC 
 Dworkin's Game Driver (DGD)

Lua 
 OpenResty
 Tarantool

.NET

Microsoft 
Microsoft positions their middle-tier applications and services infrastructure in the Windows Server operating system and the .NET Framework technologies in the role of an application server:
 Internet Information Services web server
 Windows Server AppFabric
 .NET Framework (Windows Communication Foundation, Web Services, .NET Remoting, Microsoft Message Queuing (MSMQ), ASP.NET, ADO.NET)
 Distributed Transactions, COM+
 Active Directory Lightweight Directory Service (ADLDS), Active Directory Federation Services (ADFS), Authorization Manager

Third-party 
 Mono  Developed by Xamarin, licensed under MIT

Objective-C 
 GNUstepWeb - WebObjects 4.5 compatible, licensed under LGPL

PHP 
 Appserver.io, an open-source PHP application server.
 RoadRunner, built by Spiral Scout is high-performance PHP application server, load-balancer and process manager written in Golang.

Python 
 uWSGI
 Gunicorn
 CherryPy
 Google App Engine
 mod_python
 mod_wsgi
 Phusion Passenger
 Paste
 Tornado
 Twisted
 Web2py
 Zope  By Zope, Inc.

Ruby 
 Mongrel
 Passenger
 Puma
 Unicorn

Smalltalk 
 Seaside  A continuations based web application server

Tcl 
 AOLserver  Forked from NaviServer after developer was bought by AOL in 1995
 NaviServer  Resumed independent development after AOL dropped AOLserver support.

See also 
 Content management systems
 Web framework
 Comparison of web frameworks
 Comparison of server-side JavaScript solutions

References 

Java enterprise platform
Lists of software